The Dop Doctor, also known as The Love Trail or The Terrier and the Child, is a 1915/16 South African drama film directed by Fred Paul. It is based on the book, The Dop Doctor, by Clotilde Graves. The film depicts the Siege of Mafeking during the Second Boer War through the scenario of an orphan girl that loves a soldier but is married to an exiled doctor.

The film is notable for being the first South African film to be prohibited or censored. The government of Prime Minister Louis Botha banned the film under the Defence of the Realm Act as "the film wrongly represents the Boers as being cheats and immoral."

References

External links
 

1915 films
1916 films
South African war drama films
1910s action war films
War films based on actual events
1915 drama films
Historical action films